Dale Drive is a light rail station currently under construction. It will be part of the Purple Line in Maryland. The station will be located at the intersection of Dale Drive and Wayne Avenue, adjacent to Silver Spring International Middle School.

History 
The Purple Line system is under construction as of 2022 and is scheduled to open in 2026.

Station layout
The station consists of an island platform just east of Dale Drive.

References

Purple Line (Maryland)
Railway stations scheduled to open in 2026
Railway stations in Montgomery County, Maryland
Silver Spring, Maryland (CDP)